The 1926 Clemson Tigers football team represented Clemson College—now known as Clemson University—as a member of the Southern Conference (SoCon) during the 1924 college football season. The Tigers were led by fourth-year head coach Bud Saunders for the first four game of the season, before he resigned. Bob Williams, who has previously served as the team's head coach in 1906, 1909, and from 1913 to 1915, replaced Saunders the final five games of the season. Clemson compiled and overall record of 2–7 with a mark of 1–3 in conference play, placing 18th in the SoCon.

Schedule

References

Clemson
Clemson Tigers football seasons
Clemson Tigers football